And Everything Else... is the third solo studio album by American hip hop producer Nobody. It was released on Plug Research on May 17, 2005.

Critical reception
At Metacritic, which assigns a weighted average score out of 100 to reviews from mainstream critics, the album received an average score of 73% based on 8 reviews, indicating "generally favorable reviews".

Ryan Dombal of Pitchfork gave the album a 7.1 out of 10, calling it "the producer's most diverse and song-based work yet." Adam Park of Stylus Magazine gave the album a grade of B+, saying: "With each track an alluring fusion of styles and influences that never somehow puts a foot wrong, Nobody has taken the concept of faceless producer to its appellation rendered conclusion and in doing so produced a record that positively teems with gleeful personality." Max Herman of XLR8R described it as "an electronic-induced trip, driven by an abnormal palette of sampled sounds and hip-hop-ready drum patterns."

Track listing

Personnel
Credits adapted from liner notes.

 Nobody – production, recording, mixing
 Jeff Harris – recording, mixing
 Omid Walizadeh – vocal recording
 Dave Cooley – mastering
 Chris Gunst – vocals (2)
 Jen Cohen – vocals (2)
 The Mega Farmer D's Overnight Orchestra – keyboards (2)
 Mia Doi Todd – lyrics (7), vocals (7)
 Paul Larson's Soundstripe – keyboards (8)
 Xololanxinco – lyrics (9), vocals (9)
 Prefuse 73 – collaboration (11)
 Gabriela Lopez – cover art, henna
 B+ – photography
 Keith Tamashiro – design

References

External links
 

2005 albums
Plug Research albums